The Chinese Future Giant Telescope is a proposed optical telescope with a primary mirror that has a 30-meter diameter.

Major characteristics

The Chinese Future Giant Telescope has a primary focal ratio of 1.2. Its primary mirror is segmented with 1020 annular submirrors arranged in 17 concentric annuli. Each segment has average length and width both of 0.8 m. Apart from a conventional Cassegrain focus, four Nasmyth foci on two double-deck platforms on both sides are also present. There is a Coudé focus provided for there interferometric array. The comparatively small secondary mirror is 2.74 m in diameter, which will serve active corrections. Other characteristics include:

Partial annular submirrors
One of coude planar mirrors is aspherical; better image quality is obtained from such a system. 
A pair of lens-prisms are used in a wide field of view system. Better image quality is obtained and atmospheric dispersion is corrected.

See also
 Lists of telescopes

References

Chinese telescopes
Proposed telescopes